Roberto Ortega Olmedo (born 30 April 1991) is a Spanish professional tennis player.

He advanced through the qualifiers of the 2016 Geneva Open to make the main draw defeating Michael Linzer and wild card Johan Nikles.  In the main draw he was defeated in straight set by Lukáš Rosol.

Challenger and Futures finals

Singles: 28 (15–13)

Doubles: 43 (22–21)

References

External links
 
 

1991 births
Living people
Spanish male tennis players